BKA or B.K.A. may refer to:

Places
 Bara Khyber Agency, a town in Bara Tehsil, Khyber Agency, FATA, Pakistan
 IATA code for Bykovo Airport near Moscow, Russia

Organizations
 Byelorussian Auto Moto Touring Club, a member of the Fédération Internationale de l'Automobile (FIA)
 Byelorussian Home Defence, Biełaruskaja Krajovaja Abarona, battalions who fought alongside the SS during World War II
 British Kendo Association, a non-profit organisation supporting kendo, iaido, and jodo
 Federal Criminal Police Office (Germany), Bundeskriminalamt
 BKA ASE, a specialized unit within the German Federal Criminal Police 
 Federal Chancellery of Austria, Bundeskanzleramtor BKA

Other uses
 Below-knee amputation
 Betsy's Kindergarten Adventures, a children's television show on PBS
 The phrase "better known as"
Brent–Kung adder, a type of digital logic circuit